Ali Muhammad Khan (c.1707 – 15 September 1748) was a Rohilla chief who founded the Kingdom of Rohilkhand in the northwestern region of the Uttar Pradesh state of India. He succeeded his foster father Sardar Daud Khan Rohilla at the age of fourteen and was generally regarded as a non-oppressive ruler to the masses. He was well regarded for his political ability, and was granted the right to use India's highest insignia of the Mahseer by the Emperor Muhammad Shah. His young death along with the tender age of his children led to Hafiz Rehmat Khan's regency which was in large part governed against his wishes, despite Rehmat Khan's solemn oath on the Quran to fulfil dying Ali Mohammad's will.

Early Life 
Ali Muhammad Khan was born around 1707 in a Jat family. He was among the prisoners taken by Sardar Daud Khan, chief of the Pashtun Barech tribe, during some hostilities with other Zamindars. Daud Khan liked Ali Muhammad and adopted him as his son. In the 19th century, descendants of Ali Mohammed Khan, specifically the Nawabs of Rampur, made disputed claims that he was a Barha Sayyid and began the usage the title of Sayyid. However, they could not present any pedigree or valid historical proof in the support of this claim. The Nawabs even sought service of a prominent religious leader of Rampur, Najmul Ghani for establishing ancestry from Ali, which was generally rejected.

Reign 
He succeeded rohilla Sardar Daud Khan and helped develop Rohilkhand into a powerful nation, which became independent in 1721. In 1746, due to an altercation over the collection of wood between the construction workers of Safdar Jang with the forest guards of Ali Muhammad Khan, Safdar Jang decided to eliminate him. Safdar Jang of Oudh informed the Mughal emperor of India Muhammad Shah (ruled 1719–1748), through Qamar-ud-Din Khan about Ali Mohammed Khan's supposed intentions to create his own Sultanate. Mohammed Shah sent an expedition against him, as a result of which he was imprisoned. Later he was pardoned and made governor of Sirhind. After Nadir Shah, the conqueror of Iran, took control of Kabul and sacked Delhi in 1739, Ali Mohammed Khan returned to his homeland and ruled the independent state of Rohilkhand until his death in 1748.

Faizullah Khan  was the second son of Ali Muhammad Khan. He assumed rule of the Rohillas after Nawab Saidullah Khan's.

Descendants
 Nawab Abdullah Khan first son from wife Marghalari Begum (hailing from Matni tribe) 
 Nawab Faizullah Khan second son from wife Marghalari Begum (hailing from Matni tribe)
 Nawab Saadullah Khan from wife Sarah Begum (of Bunerwal) 
 Nawab Muhammad Yar Khan son from wife Lado Begum 
 Nawab Alah-Yar Khan son from wife Raj Begum - He died of consumption around the same time that his younger brother Murtaza died. 
 Murtaza Khan - Disgusted of Hafiz Rehmat Khan's unfair treatment, he left for secunderabad where he died.
 Shah Begum, daughter, from wife Marghalari Begum (wife of Inayat Khan son of Hafiz Rehmat Khan)
 Niyaz Begum, daughter [and wife of Shah Muhammad Khan brother of Hafiz Rehmat Khan], 
 Masoom Begum, daughter, [and wife of Zabita Khan]
 Inayat Begum, daughter, [wife of Bahadur Khan Kamal Zai]
 a daughter, name unknown, who died in childhood and was engaged to a son of Qamar-ud-din Khan

See also
 Rohilla

Notes

Mughal Empire people
Rohilla
History of Uttar Pradesh
Pardon recipients
1706 births
1748 deaths
Nawabs of India
Indian people of Pashtun descent
18th-century Indian Muslims